Time of the Zombies was a U.S. only 1974 two-LP compilation album of music by the British band, The Zombies. It contained hits, non-album singles, previously unreleased tracks intended for a planned posthumous album named R.I.P. which was not released until 2000, and the whole of their April 1968 album (recorded in 1967), Odessey and Oracle. It was released on Epic Records (cat. no.: REG 32861) in 1974, several years after the group had disbanded.

Paul Weller stated in an interview with BBC Radio 4 in December 2012 that this compilation was how he first heard Odessey and Oracle, his favourite album of all time.

Track listing

References

1974 compilation albums
The Zombies albums